Bob Perry was a Scottish association football center half who played in Scotland and England before being banned by the Football Association for match fixing.  He then moved to the American Soccer League for the rest of his career.

Perry began his apprenticeship with King's Park F.C.  In 1912, he moved to Bury F.C. in The Football League.  On 29 May 1923, the FA suspended Perry and several others for life for match fixing three years earlier. He moved to the United States and in the fall of 1924, signed with J & P Coats.   In 1926, he began the season with J&P Coats, playing nineteen games, before moving to the Fall River Marksmen.  He only saw time in two games before ending the season with the New Bedford Whalers.  In 1927, Perry began the season with the Hartford Americans.  In October, the league requested the team withdraw from the league.  When they did so, Perry returned to J&P Coats where he played until 1930.  In 1929, new ownership changed the name of the team to the Pawtucket Rangers.

External links

References

1893 births
Footballers from Airdrie, North Lanarkshire
Scottish footballers
Association football central defenders
Bury F.C. players
J&P Coats players
Fall River Marksmen players
New Bedford Whalers players
Hartford Americans players
Pawtucket Rangers players
English Football League players
American Soccer League (1921–1933) players
Scottish expatriate footballers
Scottish expatriate sportspeople in the United States
Expatriate soccer players in the United States

Year of death missing